Bossiaea bombayensis, commonly known as bombay bossiaea, is a species of flowering plant in the family Fabaceae and is endemic to a small area of New South Wales. It is an erect shrub with flattened cladodes, small, scale-like leaves, and pea-like yellow to red flowers.

Description

Taxonomy and naming
Bossiaea bombayensis was first formally described in 2009 by Keith Leonard McDougall in the journal Telopea from specimens collected near the Shoalhaven River near Bombay.

Distribution and habitat
Bombay bossiaea grows in shrubland on steep rocky slopes between Warri and Bombay near Braidwood on the Southern Tablelands of New South Wales.

Conservation status
This bossiaeae is listed as "vulnerable" under the New South Wales Government Biodiversity Conservation Act 2016.

References

bombayensis
Flora of New South Wales
Plants described in 2009